A relatively widespread, damaging, and deadly tornado outbreak struck the central and southern United States in late April 2014. The storm complex responsible for the outbreak produced multiple long-track tornadoes – seven were deadly, causing 35 fatalities. One additional death occurred in Florida, due to severe flooding associated with this system.

This event was the first major tornado outbreak to hit the United States in 2014; it covered a large swath  from Nebraska to Louisiana, Illinois to Florida, and Oklahoma to North Carolina. This system affected millions in the Northeastern United States on April 30, causing significant, damaging floods in Maryland and flash flood advisories as far north as New Jersey, Pennsylvania, and the metropolitan area and suburbs of New York City.

Meteorological synopsis
A strong mid-level shortwave trough developed into a closed low-pressure area as the system occluded over the central High Plains on April 27, 2014. An associated surface cyclone reached peak intensity while a trailing cold front moved eastward across eastern Kansas, eastern Oklahoma and northern Texas. There were two areas where severe weather was expected, morning pre-frontal convection from Kansas and Oklahoma into Missouri and Iowa and warm sector supercell development across southeast Oklahoma and northeast Texas into Arkansas. The Storm Prediction Center indicated this system for six days in advance on its 4–8 day outlook.

Confirmed tornadoes

A total of 82 tornadoes over a period of four days were confirmed. Collectively, they resulted in 35 fatalities and over 300 injuries.

Quapaw, Oklahoma – Baxter Springs, Kansas

The first significant tornado of the outbreak touched down over an open field at 5:29 p.m. CDT (2229 UTC) on April 27 to the southwest of Quapaw, Oklahoma and caused EF0 damage to a ranch. It caused minor damage to homes and downed trees as it neared US 69A. Shortly thereafter, it struck the town of Quapaw at high-end EF2 strength and caused extensive damage. The local fire station was largely destroyed, and some industrial buildings sustained heavy damage. Homes in town were shifted off of their foundations or sustained loss of roofs and walls. Two people seeking shelter from the tornado in their car were struck by debris from the building they were next to; one of the occupants was killed while the other was injured. A total of 12 people were injured in the town, 7 of whom required hospitalization. A total of 50 structures were damaged or destroyed in Quapaw. The storm continued northeast and crossed the Oklahoma–Kansas state line, causing EF1-strength damage to outbuildings and downing trees and power poles. It soon moved directly through the town of Baxter Springs at high-end EF2 strength, where many homes and businesses lost their roofs, several of which had their exterior walls collapse. 90 homes and 11 business were destroyed, and an additional seven businesses and 85 homes suffered damage in Baxter Springs. A total of 34 people were injured in town, 9 of whom were hospitalized. The tornado continued northeast and eventually dissipated  from the town at 5:42 p.m. CDT (2242 UTC). Overall, the tornado remained on the ground for 13 minutes along a  path, causing 1 death and 37 injuries.

This particular tornado was unusual in that no tornado warning was issued for Quapaw before it struck the town. Meteorologists at the National Weather Service later stated that radar signatures showed no signs of a tornado until it was already over the town and by the time the warning was issued, it had moved into Kansas. The warning came only minutes before the tornado struck Baxter Springs, catching residents off-guard and forcing them to scramble for shelter.

Mayflower–Vilonia, Arkansas

Within a minute, the tornado dramatically intensified and struck a small residential area at EF3 intensity. There, two homes were destroyed and another was severely damaged. One of the homes was built with bolts along the foundation perimeter and was reduced to a bare slab, normally indicative of EF5 strength; however, it was found that the anchor bolts were not secured with nuts and washers, and nearby vehicles were not moved, which indicated a lesser intensity. Three people were killed in that area. The storm weakened as it turned more northeasterly and moved through a forested area. Damage to trees and homes in this area was rated EF1. At 7:14 p.m. (0014 UTC), it struck Northpoint as an EF2, causing severe damage to several homes. Roofs were removed entirely from homes, though the walls on these structures remained mostly intact. After briefly crossing Lake Maumelle, the tornado caused significant tree damage between Roland and Natural Steps with some trees being stripped of their foliage and debarked. Moving through an unpopulated area, the tornado intensified before crossing the Arkansas River and entering Faulkner County around 7:26 p.m. (0026 UTC).

The tornado entered Faulkner County and struck the River Plantation subdivision at the southwest edge of Mayflower. Here, EF4 damage took place with large, two-story homes being leveled with only piles of debris left on their foundations. On the northeast side of the subdivision, one person was killed after debris struck the door of her storm shelter and opened it, exposing her to the tornado. The storm shelter's door was found to have been of sub-standard construction. Near where this fatality took place, large concrete road barriers were blown over and moved, and calculations revealed that this was also likely indicative of EF4 intensity. Just outside the subdivision, a power substation sustained major damage. Continuing northeast, the storm tore across the south edge of Mayflower and crossed AR 365 and I-40, tossing semi-trucks, cars, and road equipment from the highway. I-40 was closed for a time after the storm. A business district in this area experienced mainly EF3 damage, with 18-wheelers tossed, industrial buildings damaged or destroyed, and some nearby homes heavily damaged. A recreational vehicle dealership on the other side of the highway was completely destroyed at EF4 intensity (though meteorologist/civil engineer Tim Marshall applied an EF3 rating at this location due to structural flaws), along with most of the RVs; three of which were found wrapped around a nearby billboard. A vehicle repair shop, millwork company, construction company, and church in southern Mayflower were also destroyed, and a home improvement store was badly damaged. In addition to the fatality in the storm shelter, two other people were killed in Mayflower. The tornado then crossed Lake Conway, downing numerous trees and causing a mixture of EF2 and EF3 damage to homes along the lakeshore. Some block-foundation frame homes along with multiple mobile homes were swept into the lake by the tornado. The Arkansas Game and Fish Commission lost a clubhouse, shop, horse barn, residence, metal carports, shower house, and several dog kennels in this area, and eventually removed 627 tons of tornado debris from the lake. The tornado then caused mainly EF2 damage as it struck areas in and around Saltillo. Numerous homes, mobile homes, sheds, barns, trees, and a church were damaged or destroyed in the Saltillo area. Two homes near Saltillo had only interior walls left standing, with the damage to those homes rated EF3.

Further northeast, the tornado began to re-intensify dramatically as it approached the Vilonia Bypass (US 64), reaching EF4 strength for a second time. Just southwest of the bypass, some poorly-anchored homes were obliterated and swept from their foundations, and cars were tossed hundreds of yards away. Another frame home was left with only interior walls standing, and two mobile homes were obliterated with the frames thrown up to two streets away. Two children were killed in these homes.

Shortly before 7:50 p.m. (0050 UTC), the tornado moved into the town of Vilonia at high-end EF4 strength, a town which was struck by an EF2 tornado that killed four people on April 25, 2011, three years and two days prior. The EF4 tornado first struck the recently built Vilonia Middle School, destroying the top floor and causing most walls to collapse. Numerous homes and businesses were destroyed with only piles of debris or bare slabs left behind, and vehicles were thrown hundreds of yards and mangled beyond recognition, some of which were crushed into small balls or stripped down to their frames. Trees in town were completely debarked and denuded, low-lying shrubs were completely stripped and debarked, and extensive wind-rowing of debris occurred. An aerial flyover revealed an extensive swath of ground scouring through the town. A dollar store, a strip mall, two auto repair shops, the old city hall, a gas station, a church life center, a real estate office, an investment firm, an auto parts store, and a fried fish restaurant were all completely destroyed in downtown Vilonia. Nine people were killed in the town. As it moved out of downtown Vilonia, it tore directly through the Parkwood Meadows subdivision at the northeast side of town. Entire rows of homes were reduced to bare slabs at this location, though it was revealed that the homes were nailed rather than bolted to their foundations, preventing an EF5 rating.

Continuing past Vilonia, the tornado weakened to EF3 strength as it passed just south of Williams Lake. A large metal arena building and a mobile home were destroyed in that area, with a few other structures sustaining EF1 damage nearby. Shortly after 8:00 p.m. (0100 UTC) the storm moved through densely forested areas and into White County, just west of El Paso. The tornado briefly regained EF2 status and destroyed two manufactured homes. One person was killed in one of the manufactured homes at this location. It soon dissipated at 8:06 p.m.

Overall, the tornado remained on the ground for an hour, from 7:06 p.m. to 8:06 p.m. (0006 – 0106 UTC), and traveled along a  path. Sixteen people lost their lives due to the tornado while 193 others were injured. The 16 fatalities made this the deadliest in Arkansas since an F4 tornado killed 35 on May 15, 1968. One hundred and ninety-three others were injured. It was also the first EF4 tornado of 2014 in the United States as well as the first EF4 in Arkansas since May 24, 2011. The final rating of this tornado was a source of controversy, and the National Weather Service office in Little Rock noted that if this tornado occurred prior to the change to the Enhanced Fujita Scale in 2007, it likely would have been rated as an F5 due to numerous homes being swept clean from their foundations. However, it was revealed that almost every home in Vilonia lacked anchor bolts and were anchored with cut nails instead. The new scale accounts for homes that use cut nails instead of anchor bolts, which do not effectively provide resistance against violent tornadoes. The final decision on an EF4 rating was based on this as well. However, meteorologist/civil engineer Timothy P. Marshall noted in his survey of the damage that the rating assigned was "lower bound", and despite the presence of construction flaws, this doesn't rule out "the possibility that EF5 winds could have occurred." Further inspection from surveyors revealed that one home that was swept away along E Wicker St. was indeed properly bolted to its foundation. However, an inspection of the context surrounding the house revealed that small trees in a ditch near the home were still standing, and that the residence had possibly been pummeled by heavy debris from downtown Vilonia, exacerbating the level of destruction. Surveyors decided against an upgrade to EF5 as a result.

Louisville, Mississippi

This violent, rain wrapped, and long-tracked wedge tornado tracked across northern Mississippi and through the town of Louisville on the evening of the 28th, killing 10 people, injuring over 80 and leaving major damage in its wake. The tornado touched down in Leake County, initially snapping numerous trees at EF1 intensity as it moved through heavily forested areas. The tornado proceeded to reach EF2 intensity as it completely destroyed a mobile home and a metal building. Three cars were tossed nearby, and a frame home lost most of its roof, sustaining EF1 damage. Maintaining EF2 intensity, the tornado crossed into Winston County at the Attala/Neshoba County border. Numerous trees were snapped and a house sustained roof damage at that location. The tornado then weakened momentarily, causing only EF1-strength tree damage as it moved through dense forest. Continuing northeast, the tornado reintensified dramatically and reached EF3 strength as it heavily damaged or destroyed several homes and metal chicken houses. Some of the homes sustained collapse of their exterior walls. Slightly further along the path, a large area of trees along Hartness Rd sustained extreme denuding and debarking, with only stubs of the largest branches remaining. The severity and consistency of the debarking/denuding was severe enough that surveyors applied an EF4 rating at that location. Numerous chicken houses were destroyed at EF3 intensity nearby.

Slight weakening occurred beyond this point, with consistent EF2 damage occurring: a house had its roof torn off, a mobile home was completely destroyed, and numerous trees were snapped. The tornado then regained low-end EF4 intensity, where a large complex of metal chicken houses was obliterated with little trace of them left. Nearly 220,000 chickens were killed. A nearby cell phone tower was toppled, and several homes at the edge of the path sustained roof damage. The tornado maintained EF4 strength as it moved northwest of Noxapater, sweeping away a brick building and a brick home, obliterating a mobile home, and debarking numerous trees. The tornado then weakened slightly, snapping numerous trees and power poles and destroying chicken houses at EF3 intensity. After that, the tornado weakened further, but maintained EF2 intensity as it made a dramatic turn to the north, roughly following and eventually crossing MS 15. Many trees and power poles were snapped, homes had their roofs torn off, and many mobile homes were completely destroyed in this area. One mobile home frame was found wrapped around a tree in this area.

The tornado re-intensified as it continued sharply northeastward into the south side of Louisville at EF3 strength, destroying numerous homes in residential areas. The tornado then re-attained EF4 strength as it completely destroyed three large factories in an industrial area of town, including a Georgia-Pacific plywood plant. The tornado maintained its strength as it devastated nearby subdivisions and an apartment complex, with some homes and one of the apartment buildings reduced to bare slabs. Several homes and churches were leveled or swept away in this area as well. Past this point, additional homes were destroyed at EF3 intensity, with debarking and denuding of trees noted. The tornado then passed through a wooded area and across the east edge of town, striking the Winston County Medical Center in the process. The building sustained EF3 damage, with numerous cars flipped and tossed in the parking lot. A daycare center and an automobile showroom were completely leveled across the street from the medical center, both of which were housed in manufactured structures. The owner of the daycare center died while shielding a 4-year-old child from the tornado as it struck. The tornado made another sharp turn and began moving due-north through residential areas on northeast side of town. Numerous homes sustained EF3 to EF4-strength damage in this area, including one that was reduced to a bare foundation slab. Continuing north of town, the tornado caused EF2 and EF3-strength damage to homes, trees, and power poles before dissipating in a wooded area near MS 25. Overall, ten people were killed by this tornado, and many others were injured. Some victims were found hundreds of yards from their homes.

Lincoln–Moore County, Tennessee

At 8:09 p.m. Initially, only trees were downed as the storm moved northeast; however, it soon began intensifying as it approached residential areas. Three homes were destroyed with only their interior walls left standing. The two occupants of this home were killed. Continuing northeast, a poorly-anchored home was almost completely leveled, with the debris being partially pushed off the foundation. The tornado then struck the South Lincoln Elementary school around 8:14 p.m. CDT (0114 UTC), destroying a large portion of its roof, and caused EF2 damage to two nearby homes. A school bus at the school was pushed  into the front entrance of the building. The tornado maintained EF2 strength as it moved through a small housing development and continued to cause significant damage.

Maintaining EF2 intensity, the storm struck another small community at 8:19 p.m. CDT (0119 UTC). Here, mobile homes were blown off their foundations and completely destroyed. Some of the homes rolled up to  before coming to a rest. At 8:22 p.m. CDT (0122 UTC), the tornado regained EF3 strength and toppled several metal high-tension truss towers. Two nearby homes were pushed completely off of their foundations. More noticeable weakening took place thereafter, with subsequent damage not exceeding EF1 levels. The tornado crossed US 64 around 8:25 p.m. CDT (0125 UTC) as it caused widespread tree damage. Turning north-northeast, the storm crossed into southern Moore County, Tennessee several minutes later. Damage was mostly confined to trees, though several barns and a few single-family homes sustained moderate roof damage. The tornado ultimately dissipated at 8:33 p.m. Overall, the tornado remained on the ground for 24 minutes and traveled , killing two people along the way.

Flood events
Extensive flash flooding took place as a result and numerous roads were submerged. A bridge along Highway 25 was submerged in Independence County and part of the road was blocked by a mudslide near Desha. The Spring River rose to major flood level in Hardy and Imboden, as did the Eleven Point River at Ravenden Springs. In Missouri, Dunklin and New Madrid counties were hard-hit, with residents in Lilbourn being forced to evacuate.

Between April 28 and 30, two rounds of severe weather along the Alabama–Tennessee border resulted in significant flash flooding. One of the supercell thunderstorms that produced deadly tornadoes in northern Alabama and southern Tennessee caused near-record flooding along the Big Wills Creek in Fort Payne, Alabama.

Mobile–Pensacola (April 29–30)

During the evening hours of April 29, torrential rains affected parts of the Florida Panhandle and nearby Alabama. Widespread flash flooding took place in several counties, inundating homes and causing rivers to surge to near-record levels. This total accounted for roughly 33% of the city's annual rainfall. The official National Weather Service rain gauge for Pensacola, located at Pensacola Regional Airport, was struck by lightning and lost power during the event. Using radar data, meteorologists estimated that the station received , marking the greatest single-day rainfall total on record at the site (records there go back to 1879). Numerous residents in motor vehicles were caught in the subsequent flooding. At least three hundred people were called to evacuate in the city. In the Woodbridge subdivision, a  retaining wall collapsed and thousands of gallons of water flooded nearby areas. The rush of water severely damaged one home and left roads covered in debris. Across Escambia County, Florida, emergency crews were unable to respond to 9-1-1 calls as flood waters blocked off numerous roads. One person drowned in Pensacola after her car became submerged on a flooded road. In some areas, residents were forced to seek refuge in their attics as waters rose. Damage in Pensacola alone was estimated in excess of $100 million.

A total of 170 homes were damaged by the floods, 100 of which were in Fort Walton. Twelve water pipes were also cracked or destroyed by sinkholes resulting from the flooding. At least 12 bridges in the base were washed away or damaged. More than 350 homes sustained severe damage in Santa Rosa County, with monetary losses estimated in excess of $4.8 million.

In Gulf Shores, Alabama,  of rain resulted in damage akin to hurricanes, with some residents claiming it to have been worse than Hurricane Ivan in 2004. Downtown Mobile was inundated and authorities used reverse 9-1-1 to warn residents of rising waters along the Fish River. The river ultimately crested at a record height of  surpassing the previous peak of  set during Hurricane Danny in July 1997. At least fifty people required rescue from their cars in the city. Baldwin County, Alabama emergency management director Mitchell Sims called the flooding "historical."

The extreme rainfall in Pensacola had a recurrence period of 1-in-100 to 1-in-200 years. The most notable aspect of the rainfall was the  that fell in a single hour, which had a return frequency of 1-in-200 to 1-in-500 years. The event in Mobile, Alabama was slightly less significant, having a return period of 1-in-25 years.

Around 11:00 p.m. CDT on April 30, a natural gas explosion occurred at the Escambia County Central Booking and Detention Center, killing at least 2 people and injuring 185 others. The cause of the explosion is currently unknown, however, flooding from the storm had damaged the building earlier that day.

Mid-Atlantic states (April 29 – May 1)
As the storm complex slowly moved eastward, much of the Eastern United States was affected by steady, heavy rain, bringing the worst flooding in the region since Hurricane Irene. Particularly intense rains fell around the Washington metro and surrounding areas as more than a month worth of rain fell in 24 hours. At Washington Dulles International Airport,  fell on April 30, setting a record for the day and the month of April. Up to  fell in Baltimore, Maryland. Numerous roads around the region were temporarily closed due to flooding.

The Rocky Gorge Reservoir in Maryland swelled above its banks and threatened to collapse as water began seeping through joints in the Duckett Dam, eroding soil. In order to alleviate the risk of this, officials conducted a controlled release of the Dam and evacuated 200 nearby residents. Seven gates were opened late on April 30 to lower water levels while simultaneously flooding parts of Laurel. An inspection the following morning determined that the dam sustained no damage. The nearby Triadelphia Reservoir also had water released through the Brighton Dam. In Hyattsville, one family had to evacuate due to flooding. Two Washington Suburban Sanitary Commission waste water systems overflowed in Prince George's County. In the Charles Village neighborhood of Baltimore, a street collapsed along an embankment above a CSX rail line, covering the tracks and taking several cars with it. No buildings were damaged by the collapse but residents in nearby homes were ordered to evacuate until inspections determined if it was safe to stay there.

The entirety of the Delaware River's watershed experienced flooding of varying degrees due to the storm. The river also flowed at 14.3 billion gallons per day near Chadds Ford, Pennsylvania, the third-highest on record. Downstream, a gauge near Brandywine Park broke well-before peak flows reached the area. Several families along the river were evacuated due to rising waters. The White Clay Creek, a tributary to the Brandywine Creek, reached its fourth-highest flow on record at 9.44 billion gallons per day. Additionally, the Red Clay Creek crested at its sixth-highest level on record. Throughout Delaware, 81 road accidents related to the rain took place, with 11 resulting in injuries.

A landslide in Yonkers, New York, south of the Glenwood station, interfered with Metro-North's Hudson Line, blocking two tracks and causing delays. New York City saw exactly  of rain, and a landslide developed in Port Washington. Due to the heavy rain, both the New York Yankees and New York Mets had to postpone their games until the next day. Just before 4am on May 1, a person died due to a car crash on the ramp between Interstate 495 and Interstate 295 in Queens, but it is unknown if the floods were the cause of the crash.

Aftermath
Prior to the arrival of severe storms, a state of emergency was declared for Alabama, Florida, Georgia, and Tennessee on April 28. In Alabama, 100 National Guard troops were placed on standby to assist communities.  Following destructive tornadoes later that day, a state of emergency was also declared for Mississippi.  State Medical Assistance Teams were deployed to Tupelo and Winston County while a resupply truck was sent to Winston County.  Additionally, a public shelter was opened in Lee County. Ottawa County, Oklahoma was later placed under a state of emergency as well.

On April 29, Faulkner County, Arkansas, was declared a federal disaster area by President Barack Obama.  This allowed residents to receive federal aid and low-cost loans to cover uninsured losses.

In the wake of the severe flooding in Florida, Governor Rick Scott declared a state of emergency for 26 counties.  The Florida National Guard, equipped with high-water rescue vehicles, was deployed to the Panhandle region early on April 30.  Additionally, the Florida Fish and Wildlife Commission provided thirty-one road vehicles and thirteen boats to assist.  A local state of emergency was also declared in Escambia County.  Throughout the county, all schools and businesses were closed and only essential personnel were to report to work.  Emergency officials urged all residents to stay home and not call 9-1-1 unless they had a life-threatening emergency.  A Red Cross shelter was opened in Pensacola to house displaced residents. Similarly, local emergencies were raised in Walton and Washington counties as well as the cities of Crestview and Destin.

On April 30, freight rail on the CSX line north from Baltimore was interrupted, perhaps for days, when an unstable retaining wall in the Charles Village section of the city collapsed, sending several automobiles off the road into the railway gully.

See also

 List of disasters in the United States by death toll
 List of North American tornadoes and tornado outbreaks
 List of F5 and EF5 tornadoes
 Tornado records
 Tornado outbreak and floods of April 28 – May 1, 2017

References

Notes

External links
Tornado Coverage - April 28, 2014: 9-10pm - The Weather Channel
April 28, 2014 Tornado Outbreak Coverage ABC 33/40
Richard Scott's Coverage of the Alabama Tornado Outbreak of April 28, 2014

F4 tornadoes by date
Tornadoes in Arkansas
Tornadoes in Mississippi
Tornadoes in Missouri
Tornadoes in Nebraska
Tornadoes in Oklahoma
Tornadoes in Alabama
Tornadoes in Tennessee
Tornadoes of 2014
Tornado
2014 in Arkansas
2014 in Mississippi
2014 in Missouri
2014 in Nebraska
2014 in Oklahoma
Tornado outbreak